Calabar High School is an all-male secondary school in Kingston, Jamaica. It was established by the Jamaica Baptist Union in 1912 for the children of Baptist ministers. It was named after the Kalabari Kingdom later anglicized by the British to Calabar, in present-day Nigeria. It has produced at least five Rhodes Scholars, and is respected for its outstanding performance in track and field.

History

Early beginnings
In 1839, William Knibb, Thomas Burchell and James Phillippo, the three leading English Baptist missionaries working in Jamaica, worked to create a college to train native Baptist ministers. Out of this effort, Calabar Theological College was founded in 1843, sited in the village of Calabar, near Rio Bueno in Trelawny Parish. The British named Calabar after the Kalabari Kingdom in Nigeria of the same name.

In 1868, Calabar College was removed to East Queen Street, Kingston, where a "normal" school for training teachers and a high school for boys were added. Shortly afterwards, the high school was closed and the teacher-training activities ceased. This left the practising school—now Calabar All-Age on Sutton Street—and the theological college, which was relocated at Studley Park (on Slipe Pen Road) in 1904.

High school established
At the beginning of the 1900s, there were few high schools to educate the sons of the working class and the rising middle class. In September 1912, the Revs. Ernest Price and David Davidson—Principal and Tutor, respectively, of Calabar Theological College, founded Calabar High School under the joint sponsorship of the Baptist Missionary Society of London and the Jamaica Baptist Union.

The high school opened 12 September 1912, with 26 boys; the foundation was laid in the Christian tradition. Rev. Price was the first headmaster. Within a year enrollment had reached 80 and the school had received government recognition. An early benefactor was Elizabeth Purscell, who in 1919 bequeathed the adjoining property on Studley Park Road in trust for the school. The school offered boarding facilities on nearby premises —the Hostel— to facilitate boys attending from outside the Corporate Area of Kingston.

Relocation
In 1952, Calabar Theological College and Calabar High School moved from their location at Studley Park to Red Hills Road, where  of land (then called "Industry Pen") had been purchased for the re-siting of both institutions. At the time, this was a thinly populated, undeveloped area and many people thought the move unwise. The new school was built to house 350 boys but before long, extensions were needed. The school provided boarding facilities up to 1970. When boarding ceased, dormitories were converted to workshops.

In 1967 the Theological College moved to Mona as a part of the United Theological College of the West Indies and the High School took over the vacated space. This is the section of the premises which the boys now call "Long Island." At about this time a portion of the Calabar lands was sold, to be used for commercial and residential development. A privately run Extension School was added in 1971.

In 1978, the school adopted a shift system incorporating the day and extension schools, at the request of the Ministry of Education. There are over 1600 students on roll, with eight forms in each year group between grades 7 and 11, and four forms in grades 12 and 13 (sixth form).

Accomplishments
Major scholarships —such as the Jamaica and Rhodes Scholarships— have been awarded to Calabar students. Sports, particularly athletics, have always been important and the Inter-Schools’ Athletics Championships ("Champs") Trophy has been won 26 times since 1930.

One major accomplishment is in the Schools' Challenge Quiz, where Calabar is the only school to win the competition three years in a row. Its team has been to six finals in one decade, the most of any school, competing in 2001, 2004, 2005, 2006, 2007 and 2012.

Insignia

Motto
The school motto is "The Utmost for the Highest".

Colours
The official school colours are green and black.

Mascot
The school's mascot is a roaring lion, an homage to the school being named after the Kalabari Kingdom in present day Nigeria.

Extracurricular activities
In sports the school dominates all major sporting areas, including track and field, football, basketball, cricket, badminton, and rugby. Calabar was the first school in Jamaica to have a swimming pool and won the inter-schools swimming competition repeatedly for many years. When the school was relocated to Red Hills Road in 1953, the boys helped to construct the new pool. At the Annual Boys and Girls Athletics Championships, the competition for which the school is most famous, Calabar is the only boys school to have won Champs titles in every decade since the 1930s.

In 2012, the school won both School Challenge Quiz and the all-island Boys Athletics Championships title (its 24th overall).

In 2008, the school Rugby Union team created history: for the first time, it placed a team in the finals of all four competitions entered. The boys won the Under-19 15-a-side competition for the second time in school's history and were runners-up in the under 16 version. The team was coached by old boys Sheldon Phillips and Romeo Monteith, with Nesta Dawkins as manager.

In Rugby Football the school became the first to win the U19 15s championship 3 consecutive years (2008–2010). The school also won the inaugural U16 Rugby League championship in 2009.

Calabar is the only school to have won the popular School's Challenge Quiz on three consecutive occasions.

Notable alumni

Academia
Prof. Norman Girvan, former Secretary General of the Association of Caribbean States
Prof. Franklin W. Knight, Professor Emeritus, Johns Hopkins University
Prof. John-Paul Clarke, professor of Aerospace Engineering and Engineering Mechanics at The University of Texas at Austin, where he holds the Ernest Cockrell Jr. Memorial Chair in Engineering

Medicine
Dr Ernest W Price, son of the first principal, Rev. Ernst Price, medical missionary, Leprosy specialist, orthopaedic surgeon and discoverer of Podoconiosis

Arts and culture
Carl Abrahams, painter
Damian Beckett, singer-songwriter and actor
John Holt, singer
Roger Mais, writer
Wilmot Perkins, talk show host

Politics and law
Francis Forbes, former Commissioner of Police
John Junor, former Minister of Health
Percival James Patterson, former Prime Minister of Jamaica
Antony Anderson, Commissioner of Police
Derrick Smith, Minister of Mining and Technology

Sports
Andrew Kennedy, basketball player, 1996 Israeli Basketball Premier League MVP
Herb McKenley, Olympic gold medalist sprinter and former world record holder
Jason Morgan, Olympic discus thrower
Nehemiah Perry, former cricketer and West Indies Cricket Board selector
Andrew Riley, Olympic hurdler
Josef Robertson, Olympic hurdler
Dean Sewell, former national football player
Maurice Smith, decathlete, World Championship silver medallist
Chris Stokes and Dudley Stokes, members of the Jamaican Bobsled Team that inspired the movie Cool Runnings
Dwight Thomas, Olympic gold medalist
Warren Weir, Olympic and World Championship medalist
Maurice Wignall, Commonwealth Games gold medalist
Arthur Wint, Olympic Gold medallist runner and former world record holder
Javon Francis, Olympic and World Championship silver medalist
Christopher Taylor, Olympic Finalist and World Championship silver medalist 

Other
Colin Ferguson, perpetrator of the racially motivated 1993 Long Island Rail Road shooting
Adijah Palmer, Dancehall artiste

Principals

See also
 Jamaica High School Football Champions
 Education in Jamaica

References

External links

Aerial view.
Photos:
 Calabar Old Boys' Association
 Calabar Old Boys' Association (Canada Chapter)
 Calabar Old Boys Association (Atlanta Chapter)
 Calabar Old Boys Association (UK Chapter)
 Calabar Lions (community website and blog)
 Jamaica Baptist Union

Schools in Jamaica
Educational institutions established in 1912
Schools in Kingston, Jamaica
1912 establishments in Jamaica